Duangnapa Sritala (born 4 February 1986) is a Thai international footballer who plays as a defender.

International goals

References

External links 
 
 
 

1986 births
Living people
Women's association football defenders
Duangnapa Sritala
2015 FIFA Women's World Cup players
Duangnapa Sritala
Footballers at the 2006 Asian Games
Footballers at the 2010 Asian Games
Footballers at the 2014 Asian Games
Duangnapa Sritala
Duangnapa Sritala
Duangnapa Sritala
Southeast Asian Games medalists in football
Footballers at the 2018 Asian Games
Competitors at the 2007 Southeast Asian Games
Competitors at the 2017 Southeast Asian Games
2019 FIFA Women's World Cup players
FIFA Century Club
Duangnapa Sritala
Duangnapa Sritala
Duangnapa Sritala